William Richmond Dimock (April 7, 1923 – November 22, 2016) was a Canadian ice hockey player with the Sudbury Wolves. He captained the team which won the silver medal at the 1949 World Ice Hockey Championships in Stockholm, Sweden.

He also played with the Verdun Rams and Alberta Golden Bears.

He lived in Pictou County, Nova Scotia, where he was honoured by the Pictou County Sports Heritage Hall of Fame in 2014. He died in 2016  and is buried at Heatherdale Memorial Gardens in Nova Scotia.

References

1923 births
2016 deaths
Canadian ice hockey centres
Sudbury Wolves players